Saga 106.6FM was an independent radio station for the East Midlands, broadcasting to Derbyshire, Leicestershire, Lincolnshire, Nottinghamshire and Rutland. Part of the Saga Radio Group, the regional station was broadcast from the Riverside Business Park in Nottingham, close to the old Central/Carlton Television studios on Lenton Lane.

Presenters 
The array of presenters on the station included many who made their names on the region's commercial stations. These included John Peters, who launched Radio Trent (the East Midlands' first commercial radio station in 1975), Amanda Bowman, Tony Lyman, Tim Gough, Steve Merike, Paul Robey, Jeff Cooper, Andy Marriott, Ian Chilvers, Mark Burrows, Ron Coles, Steve Orchard, Tim Rogers, David Lloyd, Ashley Franklin, Peter Quinn, Sheila Tracy, David Hamilton, Mike Wyer and Erica Hughes. Paul Robey was also Saga's Group Programme Director.

Programming 
The station's output was aimed at an audience over the age of fifty, with the playlist covering most genres from the 1940s to the present day, along with specialist shows focussing on Country and Western, Jazz, Big Band music and Rock and Roll.

Broadcasting 
The main 106.6FM signal came from the Waltham transmitter (near Melton Mowbray), while the 101.4FM signal came from the Drum Hill transmitter near Little Eaton in Derbyshire. The station was also available on DAB on the NOW Nottingham ensemble and online.

Rebranding 
Following the purchase of the Saga Radio Group stations by GMG Radio in December 2006, it was announced that Saga 106.6 would be rebranded as 106.6 Smooth Radio from March 2007. This was in line with other Saga radio stations which would also be renamed.  The station closed shortly after 18:00 on Friday 23 March 2007, following which there was a preview weekend for the relaunch.

Smooth Radio began broadcasting on Monday 26 March 2007 at 6:00.  Many of the presenters from Saga, including John Peters, Amanda Bowman and Tony Lyman, went on to host shows for Smooth.

See also 

 Saga 105.2 FM
 Saga 105.7 FM
 Heart 106 FM

References

External links 
 Media UK
  History of local radio in Nottinghamshire
 Drum Hill transmitter
 Waltham transmitter
 Steve England's website with Saga 106.6 FM jingles

Saga
Radio stations established in 2003
Defunct radio stations in the United Kingdom
Radio stations disestablished in 2007